Jessica Paré (born December 5, 1980) is a Canadian actress and singer known for her co-starring roles on the AMC series Mad Men and the CBS series SEAL Team. She has also appeared in the films Stardom (2000), Lost and Delirious (2001), Wicker Park (2004), Suck (2009), Hot Tub Time Machine (2010), and Brooklyn (2015).

Early life and family
Paré was born in Montreal, Quebec, the daughter of Anthony Paré, former chair of the education department at McGill University, and Louise Mercier, a conference interpreter. She grew up in the Montreal neighbourhood of Notre-Dame-de-Grâce with three brothers. She speaks English and French.

Paré's father was an actor and drama teacher who toured with a theatre company, and her mother acted in amateur productions; her uncle Paul was a comedian with the sketch comedy troupe Radio Free Vestibule. Paré watched her father at rehearsals as a child and became interested in acting while helping him learn his lines for a production of The Tempest.

Her relatives include great-grandfather Al Paré and great-great-uncles Noah and Henry Timmins. 18th-century Irish dramatist, fiction writer, essayist and actress Elizabeth Griffith is also Paré ancestor through her son, politician Richard Griffith.

Education
Paré attended Villa Maria, a private Catholic high school in Montreal. She studied drama at TheatreWorks and appeared in over half a dozen amateur theatre productions as a teenager, including roles as Maid Marian in Robin Hood and Lucy in The Lion, the Witch and the Wardrobe.

Career
Paré landed a small role in the television film Bonanno: A Godfather's Story during her final year in high school, which convinced her to pursue acting as a career. She also had small roles in an episode of the horror television series Big Wolf on Campus and the French film En Vacances (1999). She dropped out of the fine arts program at Montreal's Dawson College and pursued acting for two years. At one point, she worked as a photographer's assistant on automotive photo shoots.

After Paré auditioned for a bit part for the independent film Stardom (2000), director Denys Arcand chose her to star in the film. She played a naive ice hockey player propelled to international stardom as a supermodel. The comedic satire closed the 2000 Cannes Film Festival with mixed reviews from critics. Paré became the Canadian film industry's "it girl" following the film's release. She was also voted one of the 25 Most Beautiful People of 2012, by People, one of only a few Canadian citizens to have ever been granted this designation.

Paré next starred in Lost and Delirious (2001), a story of two young lovers set in a girls' boarding school. The film debuted to mixed reviews at the Sundance Film Festival. The performances of Paré and her co-stars Mischa Barton and Piper Perabo were, however, widely praised. Paré appeared in the television miniseries Random Passage (2002), based on a series of award-winning novels by Bernice Morgan. Also that year, she appeared in the television miniseries Napoléon as the emperor's mistress and had a cameo appearance as a pop singer in Deepa Mehta's Bollywood/Hollywood (2002). The following year, she starred in the girl gang thriller film Posers (2003), after which she appeared in the CTV film The Death and Life of Nancy Eaton, in the title role of murdered heiress Nancy Eaton.

Paré made her Hollywood debut in the film Wicker Park (2004). That year, she also starred in the television miniseries Lives of the Saints, was in the mockumentary See This Movie (2004), and had a role in The WB teen drama series Jack & Bobby, about two brothers, one whom grows up to be the President of the United States; Paré's character grows up to be the First Lady.

Paré shot the CBS pilot Protect and Serve in 2007, co-starred in the independent French-Canadian romantic comedy Jusqu'à toi, and had a small role in The Trotsky (2008), a comedy filmed in Montreal.

She filmed Suck (2008), a vampire horror-comedy written and directed by Rob Stefaniuk, for which role she learned to play the bass guitar. Suck premiered at the 2009 Toronto International Film Festival as part of the Contemporary World Cinema programme. Paré was nominated for a 2010 Canadian Comedy Award for best female performance in film for the role.

Paré played a groupie in the comedy film Hot Tub Time Machine (2010). That year, she also appeared in the Canadian comedy Peepers, about pleasures in voyeurism. Peepers competed in the Just for Laughs film festival in Montreal in July 2010.

Also in 2010, Paré joined the cast of the AMC television series Mad Men, playing Don Draper's second wife, Megan Calvet. Paré's character had a prominent role in the Season 5 opener of Mad Men, in which she danced and sang a version of the 1960 Gillian Hills hit "Zou Bisou Bisou". Her recording of the song was subsequently released as a download and on vinyl.

In 2011, Paré appeared in Beholder. The short film, directed by Nisha Ganatra, premiered as part of the ITVS/PBS series FutureStates. She also starred in The Mountie (also known as The Way of the West, and filmed under the working title of Red Coat Justice in 2009), a western about the North-West Mounted Police, filmed in a remote location outside of Whitehorse, Yukon, and in the comedic short Sorry, Rabbi, directed by Mark Slutsky.

In 2012, Paré appeared on stage with The Jesus and Mary Chain, singing "Just Like Honey", for two concerts in Buffalo, New York and Toronto. That same year, she filmed the romantic comedy, Standby, in Luxembourg and Ireland; she plays the female lead, Alice. It was released in 2014.

In 2017, Paré was added to the main cast of the CBS television series SEAL Team as Amanda Ellis, the team's CIA liaison. The series was renewed for a fourth season in 2020.

Personal life 
Paré married writer and producer Joseph M. Smith in 2007. They divorced in 2010.

In 2013 she was dating musician John Kastner. On March 19, 2015, she gave birth to a son, Blues Anthony Paré Kastner.

She was in a relationship with Jacob Housten from 2019 until 2021.

Paré is Catholic. She identifies as a feminist, telling Fashion magazine, "Of course I'm a feminist... If you're not for the equal treatment of men and women, then you're a fascist."

Filmography

Film

Television

Discography
"Zou Bisou Bisou" – single – music download, vinyl special edition – released March 26, 2012

Citations

Other sources
"Jessica Paré". Encore Entertainment. Retrieved on October 3, 2007.

External links

1980 births
Canadian film actresses
Canadian television actresses
Canadian voice actresses
Living people
People from Côte-des-Neiges–Notre-Dame-de-Grâce
Actresses from Montreal
Anglophone Quebec people
Canadian Roman Catholics
Dawson College alumni
20th-century Canadian actresses
21st-century Canadian actresses
Canadian expatriate actresses in the United States
Canadian feminists
Catholic feminists
Feminist musicians